Bheel may refer to:

Bhil, a tribe from Central India
Beel, a type of flood pond in the Lower Ganges – Brahmaputra flood plains
Khadem (tribe), a Bhil tribe from Ajmer, Rajasthan, India
Krishan Bheel (born 1968), Hindu politician in Pakistan

See also
Beal (disambiguation)
Bil (disambiguation)
Beale
Beall